Robert Cristian Gherghe (born 5 May 1996) is a Romanian professional footballer who plays as a defender for CSM Slatina. In his career Gherghe also played for Olt Slatina, Metaloglobus București and second team of FC Voluntari.

International career
Robert Gherghe played in 3 official matches for Romania U-19.

References

External links
 

1996 births
Living people
Sportspeople from Slatina, Romania
Romanian footballers
Association football defenders
Liga II players
FC Voluntari players
FC Metaloglobus București players
CS Mioveni players
FC Brașov (2021) players
CSM Slatina footballers